Yevgeny Kharitonov may refer to:

 Yevgeny Kharitonov (politician) (born 1946), Russian politician
 Yevgeny Kharitonov (poet) (1941–1981), Russian poet